Lethbridge is a surname. Notable people with the surname include:

 Alice Lethbridge (1866–1948), English music hall dancer and Gaiety Girl
 Arthur Lethbridge (Ivor of Ivor Moreton and Dave Kaye) (1908–1984), British singer and pianist
 Christopher Lethbridge (cricketer) (born 1961), English cricketer
 Grace Marguerite Lethbridge or Grace Marguerite Hay Drummond-Hay (1895–1946), the first woman to travel around the world by air
 John Lethbridge (1675–1759), inventor of an early diving apparatus in 1715
 John Sydney Lethbridge (1897–1961), British soldier
 Julian Lethbridge (born 1947), British painter
 Robert Lethbridge (born 1947), professor of French and Master of Fitzwilliam College Cambridge
 Roper Lethbridge (1840–1919), British academic and civil servant in India
 T. C. Lethbridge (1901–1971), British explorer, author, archaeologist and psychic researcher
 Timothy C. Lethbridge (born 1963), Canadian computer scientist and Professor, University of Ottawa
 William Lethbridge (1825–1901), after whom the city of Lethbridge, Alberta, was named
 Nemone Lethbridge (1932–present), barrister and playwright. Daughter of John Sydney Lethbridge 

Fictional characters:
 Brigadier Lethbridge-Stewart, a character on the television show Doctor Who

Surnames
English-language surnames
Surnames of English origin
Surnames of British Isles origin